This is a list of all tornadoes that were confirmed by local offices of the National Weather Service in the United States from June to August 2015.

United States yearly total

June

June 1 event

June 2 event

June 3 event

June 4 event

June 5 event

June 6 event

June 7 event

June 8 event

June 9 event

June 10 event

June 11 event

June 12 event

June 13 event

June 14 event

June 15 event

June 16 event

June 17 event

June 18 event

June 19 event

June 20 event

June 21 event

June 22 event

June 23 event

June 24 event

June 25 event

June 26 event

June 27 event

June 28 event

June 29 event

June 30 event

July

July 1 event

July 2 event

July 5 event

July 6 event

July 7 event

July 8 event

July 9 event

July 10 event

July 11 event

July 12 event

July 13 event

July 14 event

July 16 event

July 17 event

July 18 event

July 19 event

July 20 event

July 21 event

July 23 event

July 24 event

July 25 event

July 26 event

July 30 event

July 31 event

August

August 2 event

August 3 event

August 4 event

August 6 event

August 8 event

August 9 event

August 10 event

August 13 event

August 16 event

August 17 event

August 18 event

August 20 event

August 28 event

August 29 event

See also
Tornadoes of 2015
List of United States tornadoes from April to May 2015

Notes

References

Tornadoes of 2015
2015, 06
June 2015 events in the United States
August 2015 events in the United States
July 2015 events in the United States